Otto Münch (1885–1965) was a German artist.

The bronze doors of the Grossmünster in Zürich, Switzerland, are considered to be his most important work. The reliefs on the south portal, showing Reformation scenes and other images of the history of the Grossmünster, were created in 1935–1938. The ones on the north portal, showing Biblical scenes, were finished in 1950.

Gallery

References

German sculptors
German male sculptors
Swiss sculptors
Modern sculptors
1885 births
1965 deaths
20th-century German sculptors
20th-century German male artists